Keremeos Columns Park is a provincial park in British Columbia, Canada.

References

Provincial parks of British Columbia
Provincial parks in the Okanagan
Similkameen Country
Volcanism of British Columbia
1931 establishments in British Columbia
Protected areas established in 1931